Esto huele mal  (English: This smells bad) is a 2007 Colombian drama comedy film directed by Jorge Ali Triana. The film is based on the eponymous novel written by Fernando Quiroz, who was inspired by real-world events. The plot follows the story of a businessman who lies about being the victim of a terrorist attack to hide his infidelities to his wife from her.

Plot
Ricardo Caicedo is a well-to-do businessman in Bogotá, who in all appearances has a happy family life. His wife, Elena is devoted to him and the couple have a young son. However, Ricardo has been having an affair with a mistress named Manuela, which started a year ago. One day, in order to be with his mistress, Ricardo pretends to have a business meeting with several Argentinian associates at the Nogal Club. His lie is about to be uncovered when a terrorist placed a bomb at the club where Ricardo was supposed to be. His wife is worried about his safety and calls him. Ricardo is on the other side of town leaving Manuela’s house. To avoid revealing his infidelity Ricardo is determined to prove that he was at the scene of the attack. Aided by his friend Guzman, Ricardo invents an elaborate lie which portrays him as being one of the many victims of the terrorist attack. He is mistaken to be the saviour of a little girl's life and he becomes a hero.

Cast 
 Diego Bertie - Ricardo
 Cristina Campuzano - Elena
 Valerie Domínguez - Manuela
 Diego Cadavid – Guzman
 Maria Eugenia Dávila- Elena’s mother
Naty Botero – Patricia
Víctor Hugo Morant – Elena’s father
Sandra Reyes- Journalist

DVD release
 Esto huele mal  is available on DVD. Audio in Spanish, with English  subtitles.

External links
 

2007 films
2007 black comedy films
Colombian comedy-drama films
Films shot in Colombia
2000s Spanish-language films
2007 comedy-drama films